Byun Jang-ho (27 April 1940 – 25 February 2022) was a South Korean film director.

Biography
Byun made about 90 films in a career that spans more than 30 years. His film Love Me Once Again Despite Hatred '80 (1980) is one of the greatest box office hits in 1980.

Jang-ho was born on 27 April 1940.  His film Potato (1988) is a remake of a 1967 film and the second adaptation of Kim Dong-in's short novel of the same name. It won Best Supporting Actor, Best Supporting Actress, Best Screenplay and Best Music at the 26th Grand Bell Awards in 1987.

Jang-ho died on 25 February 2022, at the age of 81.

Filmography 

The Sun is Mine (1967)
Lost Love in the Mist (1969)
Affection and Love (1969)
Window (1969)
Temptation (1969)
The Rainy Myungdong Street (1970)
Wang and Pak on Myeongdong Street (1970)
When a Woman Removes Her Makeup (1970)
Men vs. Women (1970)
My Love, My Foe (1971)
Find the 72 Karat Diamond (1971)
It Rains on the Heart of a Man (1971)
I'm a Man on Myungdong (1971)
Black Rose in Shanghai (1971)
Leaving in the Rain (1971)
Cruel History of Myeongdong (1972) 
Life is on the Lonely Road (1972) 
A Way of Farewell (1972) 
An Odd General (1972)  
Gate of Woman (1972) 
Wedding Dress in Tears (1973) 
The Tragedy of Deaf Sam-yong (1973) 
Wedding Dress in Tears 2 (1974) 
Black Butterfly (1974) 
The Executioner (1975) 
Story of the Youth (1975) 
Woman Like A Crane (1975) 
The Kept Woman (1976) 
Miss Oh's Apartment (1978)
Young-ah's Confession (1978)
The Light Goes Off in Your Window (1978)
Red Gate of Tragedy (1979)
Miss Oh's Apartment (Sequel) (1979)
Zero Woman (1979)
Eul-hwa (1979)
The Happiness of an Unhappy Woman (1979)
Love Me Once Again Despite Hatred '80 (1980)
Goodbye Daddy '81 (1981) 
Forgive Me Once Again Despite Hatred '80''' (1981) Choi In-ho's Evening Color (1982)Night of a Sorceress (1982)Love and Farewell (1984)Milky Way in Blue Sky (1986)Eve's Second Bedroom (1987)Potato (1988)Honeymoon (1989)A Journey with Korean Masters (2013)

 Awards 
1971 8th Blue Dragon Film Awards: Best New Director (When a Woman Removes Her Makeup'')

References

External links 
 
 
 

1940 births
2022 deaths
South Korean film directors
Hanyang University alumni
Best Director Paeksang Arts Award (film) winners
People from Icheon
People from Gyeonggi Province